Vose is a surname. Notable people with the surname include:

 Christopher Vose (1887–1970), English cross-country runner
 Dominic Vose (born 1993), English footballer
 George L. Vose (1831–1910), American railroad engineer
 George Vose (1911–1981), English footballer
 Richard H. Vose (1803–1864), politician in Maine, USA
 Roger Vose (1763–1841), politician in New Hampshire, USA

Middle name
 Thomas Vose Daily (1927-2017), American Roman Catholic bishop

See also
 Laurence Vaux (1519–1585), canon regular and Catholic martyr
 Vose' District in Tajikistan
 Vose Seminary, a Christian college in Australia
 Hulbuk, of which Vose was a former name